Vent or vents may refer to:

Science and technology

Biology
Vent, the cloaca region of an animal
Vent DNA polymerase, a thermostable DNA polymerase

Geology
Hydrothermal vent, a fissure in a planet's surface from which geothermally heated water issues
Volcano, a point where magma emerges from the Earth's surface and becomes lava

Moving gases
Vent (submarine), a valve on a submarine's ballast tanks
Automatic bleeding valve, a plumbing valve used to automatically release trapped air from a heating system
Drain-waste-vent system or plumbing drainage venting, pipes leading from fixtures to the outdoors
Duct (flow), used to deliver and remove air
Flue, a duct, pipe, or chimney for conveying exhaust gases from a furnace or water heater
Gas venting, a safe vent in the hydrocarbon and chemical industries
Medical ventilator, mechanical breathing machine
Touch hole, a vent on a cannon
Vent shaft or ventilation shaft

People
Vents (musician), Australian hip hop MC
Vents Feldmanis (born 1977), Latvian ice hockey defenceman
Vents Armands Krauklis (born 1964), Latvian politician and musician
Vent., taxonomic abbreviation for Étienne Pierre Ventenat (1757–1808), French botanist

Arts, entertainment, and media

Music

Albums and EPs
Vent (album), a 2001 album by Caliban
Vent (EP), a 2008 release by Sounds of Swami

Songs
"Vent" (song), by Collective Soul
"The Vent", a song by Big K.R.I.T. from Return of 4Eva

Other arts, entertainment, and media
Vent (Mega Man), a character in Mega Man ZX
Vent (radio series), a comedy series produced for BBC Radio 4 in 2006
The Vent, a column in The Atlanta Journal-Constitution

Brands and enterprises
Vent (imprint), an imprint of the German group VDM Publishing
Ventrilo (or Vent), Internet VoIP chat software

Other uses
Vent (tailoring), a slit up the back of a jacket or coat

See also
Ventilation (disambiguation)
Venting (disambiguation)